Paucipodia inermis is a lobopod known from the Lower Cambrian Chengjiang lagerstätte. Its gut is puzzling; in some places, it is preserved in three dimensions, infilled with sediment; whereas in others it may be flat.  These cannot result from phosphatisation, which is usually responsible for three-dimensional gut preservation, for the phosphate content of the guts is under 1% – the contents comprise quartz and muscovite.  Its fossils do not suggest it had any sclerites, especially when compared with the related Hallucigenia.

See also
Lobopod guts

References

Xenusia
Cambrian invertebrates
Fossil taxa described in 2004
†Paucipodia
Prehistoric protostome genera
Cambrian animals of Asia

Cambrian genus extinctions